Mukhammadzhon Khasanovich Rakhimov, born 15 October 1998) is a Tajik professional footballer who plays as a midfielder, for Uzbekistan Super League side Nasaf.

Career

Club
In August 2017, Rakhimov signed for FC Istiklol.

On 19 July 2021, Rakhimov left Istiklol to sign for Kazakhstan Premier League club Ordabasy. After turning down a new contract with Ordabasy, Rakhimov began training with former club Istiklol during their 2022 winter training camp in Turkey.

On 31 March 2022, FC Istiklol announced the return of Rakhimov.

On 24 January 2023, FC Istiklol announced the departure of Rakhimov to Uzbekistan Super League club Nasaf.

International
Rakhimov made his international debut in a 0–0 friendly draw with Syria, replacing Nozim Babadjanov in the 70th minute.

Career statistics

Club

International

Statistics accurate as of match played 25 September 2022

International goals
Scores and results list Tajikistan's goal tally first.

Honours

Istiklol
 Tajik League: 2017, 2018 2019, 2020, 2022
 Tajik Cup:2018, 2019
 Tajik Supercup: 2018, 2019, 2020, 2021

Tajikistan
King's Cup: 2022

References

External links
 

1998 births
Living people
Tajikistani footballers
Tajikistan international footballers
Association football midfielders
FC Istiklol players
FC Ordabasy players
Tajikistan Higher League players
Kazakhstan Premier League players
Tajikistani expatriate footballers
Expatriate footballers in Kazakhstan